Lou Harry is an Indianapolis-based author, journalist, and playwright. The editor of Quill, the magazine of the Society of Professional Journalists, he is host of the podcast Lou Harry Gets Real, which is recorded in front of a live audience. His produced plays include We Are Still Tornadoes, which premiered in August 2018 at Butler University Theatre, and Lightning and Jellyfish, which premiered in October 2014 at Theatre on the Square in Indianapolis.

Biography 
Born in Wildwood, New Jersey, Wildwood, New Jersey, Lou Harry graduated from Temple University and shortly was writing professionally for Philadelphia Magazine and other outlets. While working at various city and regional magazines, he sidelined for a decade as a professional stand-up comic, co-ran the Philadelphia-based Comedy for Kids theater company, and began writing books.

His writing career led him to Indiana where his writing projects included the novel The High-Impact Infidelity Diet, (co-written with Eric Pfeffinger), which was released in 2005 by Random House/Three Rivers Press and optioned by Warner Bros.

Other books he has written or co-written include Warning: Don't Try This at Home, The Voodoo Kit (and its many sequels), The Encyclopedia of Guilty Pleasures, Dirty Words of Wisdom, Therapist in a Box, In the Can, Kid Culture, Creative Block, and  In the Can: The Greatest Career Missteps, Sophomore Slumps, What-Were-They-Thinking Decisions and Fire-Your Agent Moves in the History of the Movies.

Other books include As Seen on TV, In the Can, Strange Philadelphia, The Game of Life and Santa Claus Conquers the Martians.

In addition, his work has appeared in more than 50 publications including ' 'The Sondheim Review' ', TheatreWeek, Variety, Dramatics, Men's Health, and Endless Vacation.

He edited the now-defunct Indy Men's Magazine, which he co-created. He co-edited IMM's first book, The X-Mas Men: An Eclectic Collection of Holiday Essays. Writers featured include Michael Kun, Rev. Phil Gulley, and Doug Crandell and Todd Tucker.

From 2007 to 2018 he served on the staff of the Indianapolis Business Journal as arts & entertainment editor.

His play "Rita From Across the Street" had its professional world premiere via American Lives Theatre in 2022. His play We Are Still Tornadoes, adapted from the novel by Michael Kun and Susan Mullen, opened the 2018/19 season for Butler University Theatre followed by an industry reading in New York featuring Lilla Crawford and Jared Goldsmith  </ref>. Also in 2018, Catalyst Repertory staged his play Popular Monsters. His plays Lightning and Jellyfish and Clutter or The Moving Walkway Will Soon Be Coming to an End premiered at Theatre on the Square. The High-Impact Infidelity Diet and Beer Can Raft premiered at the Indy Fringe Festival. Midwestern Hemisphere: a suburban metaphysical comedy, co-written with Eric Pfeffinger, had its world premiere in March 2008. Staged by the Heartland Actors Repertory Theatre, it was the first full theater production ever staged in the Indianapolis Artsgarden, a landmark location in downtown Indy. His play, "The Pied Piper of Hoboken" was developed in part through a grant from the Indiana Arts Commission.

His "live auction comedy" long-form improv show, Going...Going...Gone (co-created with John Thomas) was staged monthly in Indianapolis and has been offered in other cities. It features different actors at every performance playing characters at the fictional Ed's Auction House. After Ed's death, everything in the auction house must be sold and the characters do that while telling stories about the objects. The actors don't know beforehand what they will have to sell and the audience bids (and keeps) the sold objects, using play money provided with their programs.

References 

21st-century American novelists
American male novelists
Living people
Novelists from Indiana
21st-century American male writers
Year of birth missing (living people)